Times Radio is a British digital radio station owned by News UK. It is jointly operated by Wireless Group (which News UK acquired in 2016), The Times and The Sunday Times.

As of December 2022, the station broadcasts to a weekly audience of 563,000, according to RAJAR.

History
The launch of Times Radio was first announced on 28 January 2020. Unusually for a commercial radio station, it was conceived with the specific purpose of increasing take-up of the digital subscription package for The Times and The Sunday Times newspapers. The focus of the station was outlined in a webcast on 18 May 2020, where the tone was described as "measured, well-informed and non-adversarial". The station announced its full schedule on 2 June, and launched at 6 am on 29 June.

On its first day on air, the station broadcast interviews with Prime Minister Boris Johnson, former Chancellors George Osborne and Alistair Darling, actress Rose McGowan and the author Margaret Atwood.

On 15 October 2020, the first TV advertisement for the station was launched in the UK; it featured presenters John Pienaar, Giles Coren, Aasmah Mir, Matt Chorley, Michael Portillo, Mariella Frostrup and Stig Abell.

Gloria De Piero left the station in May 2021 to present a weekday afternoon show on GB News. Her Friday morning slot was replaced by Matt Chorley's programme, which thus became a Monday to Friday show.

Format
The format is in some ways similar to that of the news element of BBC Radio 5 Live, consisting mostly of live three-hour blocks fronted by a single presenter, except for the four-hour breakfast show with two presenters, and (on weekdays) a one-hour "early breakfast" at 5 am. With the exception of early breakfast and Matt Chorley's programme, the presenting line-up on Fridays is entirely separate from the Monday-Thursday schedule, with the weekend schedule also being distinct in its programming. Overnight hours are filled with a combination of highlights from the day's output and The Timess own podcasts. At weekends at 7 pm there are also original pre-recorded features.

There are news bulletins on the hour and summaries on the half-hour. The half-hourly summary is followed by a sports bulletin provided by Times Radio's sister station Talksport. The format accommodates live coverage of major political statements or statements from the House of Commons when required.

The content of the station builds to a large extent on the content of The Times and The Sunday Times newspapers. Discussion is mainly studio-based, although there are occasional outside reports when resources allow. The station does not generally use pre-recorded "packages" as heard on the BBC and elsewhere. Nor does it carry phone-ins, though listeners are invited to submit comments via text message, email and social media.

The station was originally free of spot advertising, which was introduced in February 2022.  Certain programmes are sponsored; the first programme to gain a sponsorship deal was Giles Coren's Friday lunchtime show, which was sponsored by Fortnum and Mason.  The station also raises revenue by generating subscriptions to The Times and The Sunday Times online.  There are frequent announcements encouraging listeners to take out a subscription, especially after items directly related to a newspaper article.

Whilst some of the station's programmes have a strong focus on hard news, presenters such as Mariella Frostrup host shows which also focus on the arts and other light-hearted subjects. This can lead to last-minute changes of presenter when a major news story breaks, as was the case upon the announcement of the death of Prince Philip, Duke of Edinburgh, which happened shortly before Giles Coren's programme was due to air and led to the show being cancelled in favour of a live programme covering the death initially hosted by Cathy Newman and Stig Abell.

Broadcasting platforms
Times Radio is available on DAB digital radio, via a free app on iOS or Android, via the newspaper's own website, and on some smart speakers. Programmes are available for seven days after broadcast either via the app or via the website.

Studios
Times Radio primarily broadcasts from a dedicated studio complex within The News Building in Central London, which is the headquarters of its ultimate owner News UK. It broadcasts from the 14th floor.

Critical reception
The station gained some unexpected publicity on its launch day when some listeners on smart speakers were directed to a similarly named radio network in Malawi operated by The Daily Times. A phone call to the Malawian network was featured on the following morning's breakfast programme. On the station's launch day, Mark Lawson wrote in The Guardian that "on the early evidence, Times Radio most resembled a good-quality karaoke BBC Radio 5 Live."

Writing in The Observer after the first week's broadcasting, Miranda Sawyer said: "Pre-launch, there was much speculation that Times Radio would be a rival to Radio 4. But aside from news shows, Radio 4 is structured around many non-live 'built' programmes: documentaries, drama, panel shows with audiences. For the moment, Times Radio doesn't have the resources to create these, and aside from a couple of pre-recorded phone interviews, everything on air is going out live. It's less Radio 4, more a light version of Radio 5 Live. 5 Lite."

Presenters

Current

Stig Abell
Kait Borsay
Matt Chorley
Alexis Conran
Ruth Davidson
Mariella Frostrup 
Ayesha Hazarika 
Aasmah Mir
Cathy Newman

John Pienaar 
Michael Portillo
Hugo Rifkind
Carole Walker
Adam Boulton
Kate McCann
Darryl Morris
Jane Garvey
Fi Glover
Rick Kelsey

Former
Gloria De Piero
Giles Coren
Tom Newton Dunn
Jenny Kleeman
Phil Williams
Rachel Sylvester 
Alice Thomson

References

External links
 

News and talk radio stations in the United Kingdom
Radio stations established in 2020
2020 establishments in the United Kingdom
Radio stations in England